This article lists the colonial governors of Italian Somaliland from 1889 to 1941. They administered the territory on behalf of the Kingdom of Italy.

Italian Somaliland
Complete list of colonial governors of Italian Somaliland:

Between 1936 and 1941, Italian Somaliland was administered as the Somalia Governorate within Italian East Africa (Africa Orientale Italiana). In 1940, British Somaliland was invaded and annexed to the Somalia Governorate and governed by Carlo De Simone as "interim military governor" until March 1941.

British Military Administration / Trust Territory of Somaliland

From 1941 until 1950, Italian Somaliland was governed by the British Military Administration. The territory was thereafter administered as the Trust Territory of Somaliland, a United Nations trusteeship with Italian administration. The governors were:

For continuation after independence, see: List of presidents of Somalia

Notes

See also
Somalia
Politics of Somalia
List of colonial governors of British Somaliland
President of Somalia
List of presidents of Somalia
List of prime ministers of Somalia
Italian Somaliland
Somalia Governorate
Lists of office-holders

References

Bibliography
Antonicelli, Franco. Trent'anni di storia italiana 1915 – 1945. Ed. Mondadori. Torino, 1961.
Calchi Novati, Gian Paolo. L'Africa d'Italia Editori Carrocci. Roma, 2011.

Somaliland
 
Italian Somaliland, Colonial governors
Italian Somaliland
Italian Empire-related lists